Ami Sirajer Begum is an  Indian Bengali television historical soap opera that ran from December 2018 to May 2019 on Bengali General Entertainment Channel Star Jalsha, The show was produced under the banner of Dag Creative Media and SVF group. The show was based on a novel by Sree Parabat about the life of 17th century Bengali ruler Siraj ud-Daulah and his wife Lutfunnisa Begum. The roles of Siraj and Lutfa were played by Sean Banerjee and Pallabi Dey.

Synopsis
The story is set against the backdrop of 18th century Bengal when Nabab Siraj ud-Daulah, the last independent ruler of the kingdom of Bengal, sat on the throne succeeding his maternal grandfather Nawab Alivardi Khan. As a ruler he faced political tension, aggression from the English, betrayal of close relatives (like his elder maternal aunt Ghaseti Begum) and his chief military advisor Mir Jafar, and various other struggles. The show is a fictionalised account of how Siraj ud-Daulah falls in love with the maid Lutfa who became his wife, Begum Lutfunnisa, and how she stands by the Nabab as his main support.

Cast
 Sean Banerjee as Nawab Siraj-Ud-Daulah aka Siraj
 Pallavi Dey as Lutfunnisa Begum aka Lutfa
 Chandrayee Ghosh as Ghaseti Begum
 Badshah Moitra as Mir Jafar
 Sayak Chakraborty as Asrafi
 Sohan Mukhopadhyay as Alivardi Khan
 Rupa Bhattacharjee as Hamida
 Tulika Basu as Sharf-un-Nisa Begum
 Mallika Majumdar as Amina Begum
 Rajesh Kr Chattopadhyay as Omichund
 Laboni Bhattacharjee as Haseena
 Sanghasri Sinha Mitra as Rabeya
 Amitava Das as Diwan Mohanlal
 Sreetoma Roy Chowdhury as Azemunnisha
 Nisha Poddar as Umdadunnissa Bahu Begum
 Ayendri Lavnia Roy as Shehzadi Afseen Begum
 Mohana Meem as Begum Gulshanara
 Ananda Chaudhury as Shaukat Jung
 Pallavi Mukherjee as Faizi Bai
 Ananya Guha as Hadiyah

References

External links

Ami Sirajer Behgum at Disney+ Hotstar

2018 Indian television series debuts
Bengali-language television programming in India
Star Jalsha original programming
2019 Indian television series endings